Idiopteryx tananaella is a moth in the family Lecithoceridae. It was described by Viette in 1985. It is known from Madagascar.

References

Moths described in 1985
Idiopteryx